"Captain Swing" was a name appended to several threatening letters during the rural English Swing Riots of 1830.

Captain Swing may also refer to:

 Swing Riots
 Captain Swing (Barwis play), 1965
 Captain Swing, a 1979 play by Peter Whelan
 Captain Swing (album), by Michelle Shocked
 Captain Swing, a character in the Discworld novel Night Watch
 Capt'ain Swing, aka Comandante Mark, an Italian comic book character